Urban Dead is a free-to-play HTML/text-based massively multiplayer online role-playing game created by British developer Kevan Davis. Set in a quarantined region of the fictional city of Malton, it deals with the aftermath of a zombie outbreak. Players enter the game either as a survivor or a zombie, each with different abilities and limitations. Survivors become zombies when they are killed, while zombies can be "revivified" with appropriate technology, returning to life as a survivor – any character played for long will thus spend some time alive and some as a zombie. There are no non-player characters in the game: all survivors and zombies are controlled by players.

Urban Dead went live in July 2005.

Gameplay

Gameplay involves zombies breaking into safe houses and attacking the inhabitants, and survivors trying to defend the buildings by barricading them and killing any zombies present. Safe houses tend to be located in or near buildings where useful items can be found, such as shopping malls, police stations, hospitals, and the laboratories of the zombie-related NecroTech corporation. Cooperation between players is not strictly enforced. Internal fighting between survivors and zombies is a frequent occurrence. Urban Dead has no economy. Survivor characters can loot supplies from abandoned buildings indefinitely, but cannot trade, sell, or give them to other players.

New players begin the game as one of the three survivor classes; Military, Scientist or Civilian; or as a Zombie. Each side in the struggle has its own advantages and disadvantages. Survivors move twice as fast as low-level zombies and are able to employ various weapons and tools. Survivor characters can communicate with each other in-game via speech, radio broadcasting, graffiti and text messaging. They can also barricade building entrances, keeping zombies at bay. Zombies, often referred to as "zeds", are limited to using claws, teeth, and blunt melee weapons. However, they can self-revive with full hit points when killed, whereas a survivor needs another player to revive them after death if they do not wish to play as a zombie. Higher level zombies can communicate with each other via a crude form of zombie speech, as well as through various groaning noises and hand gestures. It is possible to switch sides in the conflict: a survivor character that is killed will rise up as a zombie, and zombie characters may be brought back to life by a survivor who has the relevant skills and items.

Players receive action points as time passes, which are used up any time they move, fight, or undertake any other sort of activity. One action point is gained every half-hour of realtime, up to a maximum of fifty points. When a character's action points drop to zero or lower, that character is unable to perform any action until they gain further points, survivors fall asleep and zombies' brains cease to function. Should a survivor run out of action points whilst in an unsecured area, they are at great risk of attack by zombies during sleep. Players must make sure that their survivor characters are in a safe place before logging out, encouraging quick raids from fortified safe houses. The use of Action Points as a limit on character actions is similar to the systems of several other free MMORPGs such as Kingdom of Loathing.

As players damage their opponents or perform certain other actions, their experience points increase. While survivors can also gain experience from performing a variety of actions, such as healing other characters or repairing damage to buildings, zombies can only gain experience points by attacking other characters or objects in the game world. When players gain enough experience points, they can buy new skills. A character can only buy survivor skills while alive, and only zombie skills while dead; although skills of one type are not lost if the character dies or is revived, most survivor skills cannot be used by zombies, and vice versa. Survivor characters can effectively learn the skills of all survivor classes, not just the class they begin with, though skills outside of their chosen class can be more expensive. For a long time, the highest level that a player could reach if all skills were purchased was 42, however due to the skill "Brain Rot" making it more difficult to get revives, many players opt to leave it unpurchased and as a result there are a greater number of players at level 41 as opposed to level 42. On October 14, 2008, a new zombie skill "Flesh Rot" was added, thus making it possible to reach level 43. With the new additions of the skills "Bellow" and "Scout safehouse" in August 2010, the highest attainable level is now 45.

Survivors who die and return as zombies do not have to switch sides - they can gather at designated "revive points" scattered throughout the city where they wait for survivors with the relevant skills and equipment to revive them. Revive points are considered neutral ground and survivors are generally discouraged from killing zombies found there. Some players and groups on both sides have also set their own distinct goals, many of which are set for purely role-playing purposes. Urban Dead is not limited to survivor versus zombie combat, groups of survivors can attack other survivors, known as player killing. Within the game, this is viewed as an act of murder; however, it is not against the game rules and is seen by some more advanced players as playing the game on "Hard" due to only receiving half the experience points that one would receive for attacking zombies. Individuals that engage in this behavior are often tracked by bounty hunters. Some zombie groups use living characters as spies and saboteurs, usually during or in preparation for a major attack on a safe house (mainly malls). These collaborators are often referred to as "zombie spies" or "death cultists".

Development
Urban Dead was created by Kevan Davis, a freelance video game designer and web developer, in 2005. Davis was inspired by a similar game called Vampires!, which was created by a friend, and play-by-mail games. These were combined with elements of NetHack, MUSHes, interactive fiction and a zombie infection simulation he had developed in 2003. This created a game which required approximately 10 minutes of planning and play a day; involving exploration, interaction and item discovery.

Reception 
A review for The Escapist in 2007 was positive, calling this "an enjoyably deep web game". The game has attracted some attention decade or longer after its release. In 2017, a reviewer for Rock, Paper, Shogun noted that it is well executed, although suffers from now-obsolete web browser-game design. Similar opinion was expressed by another reviewer in 2018.

See also
 List of multiplayer browser games

References

External links
 Official Urban Dead website
 Official Urban Dead Wiki
 Game Statistics
 Kevan Davis

2005 video games
Massively multiplayer online role-playing games
Browser games
Browser-based multiplayer online games
Massively multiplayer online turn-based strategy games
Video games about zombies
Online text-based role-playing games
Video games developed in the United Kingdom
Video games set in Pittsburgh